is a Japanese football player. He currently plays for Nagaworld in the Cambodian League. Kogure had played previously for several clubs in Japan, including Albirex Niigata, Mito HollyHock and Azul Claro Numazu. He plays primarily as a holding central midfielder, but can also be deployed as a winger or attacking midfielder when required.

Club career

Albirex Niigata Singapore 
On 22 December 2014, it was formally announced by J1 League side Albirex Niigata via their satellite club in Singapore that Kogure has signed for the S.League side. On 30 November 2015, Kogure was named the S.League Player of the Year for the 2015 S.League season, after scoring a total of 5 goals and 13 assists in all competitions. Kogure was also part of the Albirex Niigata Singapore squad that won both the 2015 Singapore Cup and the 2015 Singapore League Cup.

Hougang United 
Kogure's impressive form in his debut season generated interest from S.League club Hougang United. On 31 January 2016, Kogure officially transferred to Hougang United for the 2016 S.League season. Kogure scored his first goal for the club on 14 April 2016, a decisive goal in a 1-0 win over Warriors FC in a S.League fixture.

International career 
Kogure has represented the Japan U19 in the 2008 AFC U-19 Championship, making a total of 2 appearances in the tournament.

Club statistics
Statistics accurate as of 23 Nov 2020

Honours

Club
Albirex Niigata (S)
Singapore Cup (1): 2015
Singapore League Cup (1): 2015

Individual 
S.League Player of the Year: 2015

References

External links 

 

1989 births
Living people
Association football people from Tokyo
Japanese footballers
J1 League players
J2 League players
Japan Football League players
Albirex Niigata players
Mito HollyHock players
Azul Claro Numazu players
Association football midfielders
Expatriate footballers in Singapore
Expatriate footballers in Cambodia
Japanese expatriate sportspeople in Cambodia